East Falls Church is an island-platformed Washington Metro station in Arlington, Virginia on the Orange and Silver Lines. East Falls Church station is the last aboveground, at grade, or open cut station for eastbound trains. East of this station, the trains enter the subway.

The station serves the communities of Falls Church and Arlington, Virginia and is located in the median of Interstate 66 near Lee Highway (U.S. Route 29). Service began on June 7, 1986. East Falls Church has a parking lot with 422 spaces on the Lee Highway side of the station.

Transit-oriented development
Of the six stations on the Orange Line in Arlington, East Falls Church has the least transit-oriented development. Unlike the Rosslyn-Ballston corridor, East Falls Church station is located in the median of Interstate 66, posing pedestrian access issues. Arlington County is currently considering plans to develop the site.

History
The station opened on June 7, 1986, as part of the final westward extension of the Orange Line to Vienna.

The Silver Line began service on July 26, 2014, resulting in East Falls Church becoming the final transfer point before its split with the Orange Line.

In May 2018, Metro announced an extensive renovation of platforms at twenty stations across the system. The platform at the East Falls Church station would be rebuilt starting in early 2021. However, due to low ridership caused by the 2020 coronavirus pandemic, platform reconstruction began one year early, and is currently under construction along with other maintenance and repair projects on all stations to the west.

This station was one of 19 WMATA stations closed due to the 2020 coronavirus pandemic. The station was further closed due to the platform reconstruction and Silver Line phase two tie-in projects which closed stations west of Ballston–MU station. Shuttle buses began serving the station on June 28, 2020. Trains began bypassing the station on August 16, 2020 when work was nearly done. The station was reopened on August 23, 2020.

Station layout
Similar to all stations within the Interstate 66 median apart from West Falls Church, East Falls Church utilizes a simple island platform setup with two tracks. There is an exit in the central part of the platform that leads to a mezzanine on the western side of North Sycamore Street. The station's parking lot and bus bays are located to the north of this exit at the southwestern corner of the intersection of North Sycamore Street and North Washington Boulevard.

References

External links
 

 The Schumin Web Transit Center: East Falls Church Station
 Sycamore Street entrance from Google Maps Street View

1986 establishments in Virginia
Stations on the Orange Line (Washington Metro)
Railway stations in the United States opened in 1986
Stations on the Silver Line (Washington Metro)
Transportation in Arlington County, Virginia
Washington Metro stations in Virginia
Bus stations in Virginia
Railway stations in highway medians